LakeVille Community Schools is a public school district in northeastern Genesee County in the U.S. state of Michigan and is part of the Genesee Intermediate School District.

Service area
LakeVille Community Schools serves the northeastern corner of Genesee County, as well as the northwestern corner of Lapeer County.

Villages
Columbiaville
Otisville
Otter Lake

Townships
Forest
Marathon
Deerfield (part)
Oregon (part)
Richfield (part)
Thetford (part)

High school

Athletics

References

External links
lakevilleschools.org
Athletic Schedule Site

School districts in Michigan
Education in Genesee County, Michigan
Education in Lapeer County, Michigan